Lunzenau is a town in the district of Mittelsachsen, in Saxony, Germany. It is situated on the river Zwickauer Mulde, 16 km west of Mittweida, and 18 km northwest of Chemnitz.

References 

Mittelsachsen